Čelopek is a village in the municipality of Staro Nagoričane, North Macedonia.

Demographics
According to the 2002 census, the village had a total of 283 inhabitants. Ethnic groups in the village include:

Macedonians 277
Serbs 6

References

Villages in Staro Nagoričane Municipality